L'Indépendant may refer to:

 L'Indépendant (Luxembourg), Luxembourgish newspaper
 L'Indépendant (Mali), Malian newspaper; see Media of Mali
 L'Indépendant (Pyrénées-Orientales), French newspaper from the Pyrénées-Orientales department

See also
Independent (disambiguation)